Mr. Novak is an American television dramatic series starring James Franciscus in the title role as a high school teacher. The series aired on NBC for two seasons, from 1963 to 1965. It won a Peabody Award in 1963.

Synopsis
The series follows John Novak, an idealistic first-year English teacher at Jefferson High School in Los Angeles, who often gets involved in the lives of his students and fellow teachers. James Franciscus, who plays Mr. Novak, previously appeared in Naked City (Episode: "Hey Teach") as an undercover homicide detective playing a high school teacher in a bad school. Principal Albert Vane was played by Oscar-winning film actor Dean Jagger; he was nominated for an Emmy Award in 1964 and 1965 for his performance. Jagger left the series in 1964 after forty-four episodes, and it was explained that his character was elected California Superintendent of Public Instruction; Burgess Meredith played the new principal, Martin Woodridge, for the remaining seventeen episodes. 

Jeanne Bal portrayed Assistant Vice Principal Jean Pagano during the 1963–64 season. Initially, plans called for increasing her role for the 1964–65 season, promoting her to second billing on the show, but the producer instead cut the number of episodes in which she was to appear, and she left the program.

The series showcased many popular actors of the time, including Martin Landau, Walter Koenig, Beau Bridges, Tony Dow, Ed Asner, June Lockhart, Sherry Jackson, and many others. This trendsetting show was the first to depict both teachers and students in a dramatic and realistic manner and was very influential on the educational community. Many cutting-edge themes were showcased, including racial discrimination, cheating on exams, anti-Semitism, alcoholism, dropouts, drug abuse, and political extremism. In its two-year run, the program won over 47 awards from various educational institutions, including the National Education Association, and was the recipient of a prestigious Peabody Award for excellence.

Cast
James Franciscus as John Novak
Dean Jagger as Albert Vane (episodes 1-51)
Burgess Meredith as Principal Martin Woodridge (episodes 52-60)

Recurring 
Vince Howard as Mr. Peter Butler
Marian Collier as Marilyn Scott
Jeanne Bal as Jean Pagano
Andre Philippe as Mr. Everett Johns
Kathleen Ellis as Ann Floyd
Larry Thor as Jim Hendricks
Phyllis Avery as Ruth Wilkinson
Stephen Roberts as Mr. Stan Peeples
Steve Franken as Jerry Allen
Charles Briles as Ken
Bill Zuckert as Mr. Arthur Bradwell
Marion Ross as Miss Bromfield
Ann Loos as Mrs. Danfield
David Saber as Toby

Guest stars 
 Claude Akins, as Lou Myerson in "One Monday Afternoon" (1964)
 Eddie Albert, as Charlie O'Rourke in "Visions of Sugar Plums" (1964)
 Frank Albertson, as Jim O'Neal in "The Death of a Teacher" (1964)
 Edward Andrews, in "The Song of Songs" (1964)
 Tige Andrews, as Lt. Charles Green in "A Single Isolated Incident" (1963)
 Ed Asner, twice as Harmon Stern and Paul Berg
 Frankie Avalon, as David Muller in "A Thousand Voices" (1963)
 Phyllis Avery, three episodes as Mrs. Ruth Wilkinson
 Diane Baker, as Mrs. Chase in "A Feeling for Friday" (1963)
 Jeanne Bal, two episodes as assistant vice-principal Jean Pagano
 Don "Red" Barry, as Anthony Gallo in "First Year, First Day" (series premiere, 1963)
 Toni Basil as Randy in "One Way to Say Goodbye" (1964)
 Herschel Bernardi, as Mr. Otis in "I Don't Even Live Here" (1963)
 Tony Bill, as Chris Herrod in "An Elephant Is Like a Tree" (1965)
 Whit Bissell, as Karl Bellini in "May Day, May Day" (1965)
 Shirley Bonne, as Susan Hotchkiss in "Sparrow on the Wire" (1964)
 Peter Breck, as Dr. Ted Dietrich in "A Feeling for Friday" (1963)
 Beau Bridges, three episodes, 1963-1965
 Geraldine Brooks, as Claire Andreas in "Love Among the Grown-Ups" (1964)
 Brooke Bundy, three episodes in different roles, including as Patrice Morgan in "X Is the Unknown Factor" (1963)
 Macdonald Carey, as Mr. Edwards in "Pay the Two Dollars" (1963)
 Virginia Christine, as Mrs. Payne in "The Exile" (1964)
 Jeanne Cooper, as Louise Sargent in "The Boy Without a Country" (1963)
 Noreen Corcoran, as Cathy Williams in "Fair The Well" (1964)
 Johnny Crawford, two episodes, as JoJo Rizzo in "Let's Dig a Little Grammar" (1964) and as a delegate from the Soviet Union in "The Tender Twigs" (1965)
 Robert L. Crawford Jr., brother of Johnny Crawford, as a Cuban delegate in "The Tender Twigs" (1965)
 Pat Crowley, as Ariel Wilder in "Love in the Wrong Decision" (1963)
 Robert Culp, as Frank Menlo in "The Tender Twigs" (1965)
 Royal Dano, as Mr. Metcalfe in "To Break a Camel's Back" (1963)
 Kim Darby, two episodes, one as Judy Wheeler (1965)
 Bobby Diamond, as Gus in "Visions of Sugar Plums" (1964)
 Micky Dolenz, as Ed in "Born of Kings and Angels" (1964)
 Tony Dow was cast five times from 1963 to 1965, three as George.
 Howard Duff, as Joe Stillman in "Mountains to Climb" (1965)
 Leo Durocher, as himself in "Boy Under Glass" (1964)
 Ross Elliott, two episodes (1963-1964)
 Richard Eyer, as Jeff in "Day in the Year" (1964)
 Shelly Fabares, two episodes as Dani Cooper (1964-1965)
 Norman Fell, as Barney Sanders in "And Then I Wrote ..." (1965)
 Frank Ferguson, as Stanley Novak in "Moonlighting" (1964)
 James Flavin, as Fire Chief Hawkins in "Beyond a Reasonable Doubt" (1964)
 Steven Franken, twice as Jerry Allen (1963)
 Bonnie Franklin, as Sally in "How Does Your Garden Grow?" and in "The People Doll: You Wind It Up, and It Makes Mistakes" (both 1964)
 Arthur Franz, two episodes as Det. Sgt. Sol Moss (1964)
 Teri Garr, as Lisa in "How Does Your Garden Grow?" (1964)
 Kathy Garver, in "Sparrow on the Wire" (1964)
 Lillian Gish, as Maude Phipps in "Hello, Miss Phipps" (1963)
 Don Grady, as Joey Carter (1964) and as Hank Nelby in "Once a Clown" (1965 series finale)
 Pat Harrington Jr., as Thomas Kelly in "There's a Penguin in My Garden" (1965)
 Joey Heatherton, as Holly Metcalfe in "To Break a Camel's Back" (1963)
 Peter Helm appeared three times, including the lead guest-star role in "The Private Life of Douglas Morgan Jr." (1964)
 Cheryl Holdridge, as Betty in "The Private Life of Douglas Morgan Jr." (1964)
 Celeste Holm, as Rose Herrod in "An Elephant Is Like a Tree" (1965)
 Sherry Jackson, as Cathy Ferguson in "The Risk" (1963)
 Arch Johnson, two episodes, once as Coach Brewer (1964)
 Zalman King in "An Elephant Is Like a Tree (1965) as Troubled Youth
 Tommy Kirk, as Tod Seaton in "Love in the Wrong Season" (1963)
 Walter Koenig Appeared in Three Episodes
 Diane Ladd, as Mrs. Otis in "I Don't Really Live Here" (1963)
 Martin Landau, two episodes as Victor Rand (1963) and as Robert Coolidge in "Enter a Strange Animal" (1965)
 Cloris Leachman, as Dorothy Hummer in the two-part episode "Faculty Follies" (1965)
 Harvey Lembeck, as Vic Rizzo in "Let's Dig a Little Grammar" (1964)
 Peggy Lipton, as Selma in "And Then I Wrote ..." (1965)
 June Lockhart, as Mrs. Nelby, mother of the Don Grady character, in "Once a Clown" (1965)
 Robert Logan, as Jerry Hendricks in "Johnny Ride the Pony: One, Two, Three" (1964)
 Claudine Longet, as Sharhri Javid in "The Silent Dissauders" (1965)
 Frank Maxwell, two episodes (1964-1965)
 Kevin McCarthy, as Mr. Williams in "Fair the Well" (1964)
 Tim McIntire, two episodes (1963-1964)
 Vera Miles, as Sister Gervaise in "There's a Penguin in My Garden" (1965)
 Patricia Morrow, four episodes as different characters
 Edward Mulhare, as Rand Hardy in "He Who Can Does" (1963)
 Lois Nettleton, as Jean Corcoran in "Where Is There to Go, Billie, But Up?" (1965)
 Simon Oakland, as Carl Green in "With a Hammer in His Hand, Lord, Lord!" (1964)
 Nehemiah Persoff, as Henry Selkirk in "Enter a Strange Animal" (1965)
 Michael J. Pollard, as Go-Go Reader in "Honor--and All That" (1965)
 Denver Pyle, as Brill in "Johnny Ride the Pony: One, Two, Three" (1964)
 Robert Random, three episodes (1964-1965)
 Tommy Rettig, as Frank in "The Firebrand" (1965)
 Katharine Ross, as Mrs. Bellway in "Faculty Follies, Part II" (1965)
 Marion Ross, as Nurse Bromfield in "Fair the Well" (1964)
 Tommy Sands, two episodes (1964-1965)
 Brenda Scott, as Sue Johnson in "Fear Is a Handful of Dust"(1964)
 Alexander Scourby, two episodes (1963-1964)
 Frank Silvera, as Andy Towner in "Boy Under Glass" (1964)
 Mark Slade, three episodes (1964-1965)
 Julie Sommars, as Ellen Cable in "The Firebrand" (1965)
 Tisha Sterling, as Myra in "The Firebrand" (1965)
 Harold J. Stone as Joe Garvin in "Beat the Plowshares, Edge the Sword" (1965)
 Maxine Stuart, as Angie (1963) and Miss Gardner (1964)
 Karl Swenson, as Mr. Haskell in "Love Among the Grown-Ups" (1964)
 George Takei, as Walter in "A Feeling for Friday" (1963)
 Buck Taylor, three episodes (1964-1965)
 Malachi Throne, four episodes (1964-1965)
 Joan Tompkins, as Mrs. Douglas Morgan Sr., in "The Private Life of Douglas Morgan Jr." (1964)
 Harry Townes, two episodes, including the role of Frank Dever in "The Death of a Teacher" (1964)
 Lurene Tuttle, as Mrs. Grange in "The Risk" (1963)
 Susan Tyrrell, in her first acting role as Phyllis Freuchen in "Beyond a Reasonable Doubt" (1964)
 Joyce Van Patten, as Avis Brown in "From the Brow of Zeus" (1965)
 June Vincent, as Mrs. Wilder in "Love in the Wrong Season" (1963)
 Beverly Washburn, two episodes (1964-1965)
 Michael Winkelman, three episodes (1963)

Episodes

Season 1: 1963–64

Season 2: 1964–65

Production
The series was created by producer/writer E. Jack Neuman and director Boris Sagal and featured top directors such as Richard Donner.

Set 
The school seen in Mr. Novak duplicated Los Angeles' John Marshall High School "complete to walks, shrubs, and parking." After using the school itself for the pilot, the duplicate was built at the Metro-Goldwyn-Mayer studios, the "largest permanent set to be constructed [there] in a number of years." The complete set filled an acre at the studio. Other construction on the MGM sound stages included duplicates of corridors and classrooms.
Exteriors for the fictional Jefferson High School were filmed at both John Marshall High School and Hamilton High School near Culver City.

Home media
The Warner Archive Collection released Season 1 of the series on DVD on November 6, 2018. Prints were made from the original 35mm camera negatives.

A soundtrack music album was released on MGM Records (E/SE-4222) in 1964, under the direction if Nick Venet.

Book Release
“Mr. Novak An Acclaimed Television Series” by Chuck Harter was published by bearmanormedia.com in October 2017 and is a comprehensive examination of the show.

See also

Room 222

References

External links

 
 Mr. Novak an Acclaimed Television Series
 Remembering Mr. Novak with Chuck Harter, Tony Dow and Walter Koenig

1963 American television series debuts
1965 American television series endings
1960s American drama television series
1960s American high school television series
American workplace drama television series
Black-and-white American television shows
English-language television shows
Novak, Mister
NBC original programming
Peabody Award-winning television programs
Television series about educators
Television series by MGM Television
Television shows set in Los Angeles